Al-Sayyid may refer to:

al-Sayyid, Israel, a village
Al-Sayyid Bedouin Sign Language
Al-Sayyid, Syria, a village

See also
El Cid (disambiguation)
Sayyid, an Arabic honorific title denoting descendants of the Islamic prophet Muhammad
Sayyid (name)